Danish National Time Trial Championships were created in 1995.

Men

U23

Women

See also
Danish National Road Race Championships
National Road Cycling Championships

References

National road cycling championships
Cycle races in Denmark
Recurring sporting events established in 1995
1995 establishments in Denmark